Knox Township is a township in Clarion County, Pennsylvania,  United States. As of the 2020 census, the township population was 997, a decrease from the figure of 1,036 tabulated in  2010.

Geography
The township is in northern Clarion County. It contains the unincorporated communities of Lucinda and Snydersburg.

Demographics

As of the census of 2000, there were 1,045 people, 391 households, and 292 families residing in the township.  The population density was 60.8 people per square mile (23.5/km2).  There were 443 housing units at an average density of 25.8/sq mi (10.0/km2).  The racial makeup of the township was 99.43% White, 0.38% Native American, 0.10% from other races, and 0.10% from two or more races. Hispanic or Latino of any race were 0.10% of the population.

There were 391 households, out of which 30.7% had children under the age of 18 living with them, 66.2% were married couples living together, 5.1% had a female householder with no husband present, and 25.3% were non-families. 22.8% of all households were made up of individuals, and 10.5% had someone living alone who was 65 years of age or older.  The average household size was 2.67 and the average family size was 3.18.

In the township the population was spread out, with 23.7% under the age of 18, 8.4% from 18 to 24, 27.4% from 25 to 44, 26.5% from 45 to 64, and 14.0% who were 65 years of age or older.  The median age was 40 years. For every 100 females there were 97.2 males.  For every 100 females age 18 and over, there were 97.3 males.

The median income for a household in the township was $40,521, and the median income for a family was $45,833. Males had a median income of $31,364 versus $17,031 for females. The per capita income for the township was $16,185.  About 5.7% of families and 7.0% of the population were below the poverty line, including 10.3% of those under age 18 and 11.0% of those age 65 or over.

References

External links
Knox Township listing at Clarion County Association of Township Officials

Populated places established in 1820
1820 establishments in Pennsylvania
Townships in Clarion County, Pennsylvania